Best Of (Chapter One 1997–2004) is the first greatest hits album by American rock band Sevendust.

Track listing

Chart positions

References 

Sevendust albums
2005 greatest hits albums
TVT Records compilation albums